Gabriel Mudaeus (c. 1500, Brecht – 21 April 1560, Leuven), born Gabriël van der Muyden, was a Flemish jurist and humanist who revived the study of law in Belgium.

As a professor in the Faculty of Law at the University of Louvain, Mudaeus introduced the Erasmian method of research into a field that had been dominated exclusively by tradition; among his pupils were François Baudouin, Jacob Reyvaert (Raevardus), and Matthew Wesenbeck.

Works

References
 R. C. Van Caenegem, D. E. L. Johnston. An Historical Introduction to Private Law. Cambridge University Press, 1992.
 David M. Walker, The Oxford Companion to Law. Oxford University Press, 1980.

1500 births
1560 deaths
Belgian jurists
Flemish Renaissance humanists
People from Brecht, Belgium
Academic staff of the Old University of Leuven
French male non-fiction writers